Quadrasiella mucronata is a species of minute, salt marsh snails with an operculum, aquatic gastropod mollusks, or micromollusks, in the family Assimineidae. This species is endemic to Guam.

References

Fauna of Guam
Quadrasiella
Assimineidae
Gastropods described in 1894
Taxonomy articles created by Polbot